Mats-Åke Lantz (born 27 October 1951) is a Swedish biathlete. He competed in the relay event at the 1976 Winter Olympics.

References

1951 births
Living people
Swedish male biathletes
Olympic biathletes of Sweden
Biathletes at the 1976 Winter Olympics
People from Östersund
20th-century Swedish people